Furcie Tirolien (January 30, 1886 in Grand-Bourg, Guadeloupe – August 28, 1981 in Grand-Bourg) was a politician from Guadeloupe. He served in the French National Assembly from 1951 to 1958.

References 
 1st page on the French National Assembly website 

2nd page on the French National Assembly website

1886 births
1981 deaths
People from Grand-Bourg
Guadeloupean politicians
Rally of the French People politicians
National Centre of Social Republicans politicians
Deputies of the 2nd National Assembly of the French Fourth Republic
Deputies of the 3rd National Assembly of the French Fourth Republic